The Journal of NeuroInterventional Surgery is a peer-reviewed medical journal covering the field of neurointerventional surgery. It is published by the BMJ Group on behalf of the Society of NeuroInterventional Surgery. It is also the official journal of the Interventional Chapter of the Australian and New Zealand Society of Neuroradiology. 

It is abstracted and indexed by Current Contents, CINAHL and Index Medicus.

References

External links 
 
 Society of NeuroInterventional Surgery

BMJ Group academic journals
English-language journals
Surgery journals
Publications established in 2009
Bimonthly journals